Yarrara is a locality situated on the Redcliffs-Merringur Road and the former Morkalla railway line in the Sunraysia region of Victoria. It is about 10 kilometres east from Meringur and 6 kilometres west from Bambill.

Notes and references